The 1960–61 DFB-Pokal  was the 18th season of the annual German football cup competition. It began on 28 July 1961 and ended on 13 September 1961. 16 teams competed in the tournament of four rounds. In the final Werder Bremen defeated Kaiserslautern 2–0.

Matches

Round of 16

Quarter-finals

Semi-finals

Final

References

External links
 Official site of the DFB 
 Kicker.de 
 1961 results at Fussballdaten.de 

1960-61
1960–61 in German football cups